Colonel Thomas Cadell  (5 September 1835 – 6 April 1919) was a Scottish recipient of the Victoria Cross, the highest and most prestigious award for gallantry in the face of the enemy that can be awarded to British and Commonwealth forces.

Cadell was the younger brother of General Sir Robert Cadell, K.C.B. and was educated at Edinburgh Academy.

VC
He was 21 years old at the time and a lieutenant in the 2nd European Bengal Fusiliers (later The Royal Munster Fusiliers) during the Indian Mutiny when he performed the deeds on 12 June 1857 at Delhi, India which resulted in being awarded the Victoria Cross:

Further information
He later achieved the rank of colonel in the service of the Indian Staff Corps and held various political appointments in India.  From 1879 to 1892 was Governor of the Andaman and Nicobar Islands. He was the cousin of Samuel Hill Lawrence. The prominent Cadell Road in Bombay (now Mumbai), was named after him. After Indian Independence in 1947, it was renamed after Indian freedom fighter Vinayak Damodar Savarkar, who was lodged at the Cellular Jail in the Andaman and Nicobar Islands.

Family

He was married to Anna Catherine Dalmahoy (d.1876), daughter of Patrick Dalmahoy WS (1798–1872) and Catherine Sawers.

References

 Indian Army at www.armynavyairforce.co.uk

External links
 Location of grave and VC medal (Edinburgh)
 

British East India Company Army officers
British recipients of the Victoria Cross
People educated at Edinburgh Academy
Indian Rebellion of 1857 recipients of the Victoria Cross
Companions of the Order of the Bath
Lieutenant governors of the Andaman and Nicobar Islands
1835 births
1919 deaths
People from Cockenzie and Port Seton
Indian Staff Corps officers